The Omaheke Regional Library is located in Gobabis (situated between Epako Suburb and the Legare Sports Stadium), Namibia, and was opened to the public on November 25, 2014, and dedicated on that day by Minister of Education, 
Dr. David Namwandi.

Funding 
The library is one of three regional libraries (the other two are in Oshakati, Oshana; and Helao Nafidi, Ohangwena). These libraries are also known as Regional Study and Resource Centers (RSRCs), and were funded by the Millennium Challenge Corporation (Namibia Account) at a cost of N$167 million. Namibia Libraries and Archive Services, a directorate under the Ministry of Education, Arts and Culture through Omaheke Regional Directorate, runs and manage the library.

Services 
The Omaheke Regional Library provides library patrons access to traditional library services and materials including access to the Internet. The library also operates a mobile unit that visits communities in the Omaheke region and is equipped with computers, televisions, and a book collection.   
  The regional library aim to provide tailored programs, ICTs, and information services that address surrounding communities’ most pressing needs. The library also offer free internet to its users.

References

Libraries in Namibia